Fiona Alison Duncan is a Canadian-American writer, artist, curator, and organizer. Duncan's first novel, Exquisite Mariposa, was awarded a 2020 Lambda Literary Award for Bisexual Fiction and long-listed for The Golden Poppy Book Award in 2019. Duncan is the founder of Hard to Read, a literary social practice on sex, love, and communication, and its spin-off, Pillow Talk. She has curated numerous international contemporary art exhibitions including Pippa Garner's first institutional exhibition in Europe at the Kunstverein München in Munich.

Early life 
Duncan was born in London, Ontario. She later moved to Los Angeles and then to New York.

Work 
Duncan has published fiction, nonfiction, interviews, and poetry in numerous publications including Vogue, Artforum, New York Magazine (where she authored the viral article on normcore style), PIN-UP, Spike, Texte zur Kunst, and The White Review.

She is the founder of Hard to Read, a literary social practice of live events with media broadcasts, bookselling, publishing, and fine art exhibitions catered to women and queer history, as well as Hard To Read's softer literary spin-off, Pillow Talk.

In 2019, Duncan published her first novel, titled Exquisite Mariposa. The novel is set in Los Angeles and is a phenomenological journey at the end of a narrator's twenties. The book follows the spiraling out of social media and other Web2.0 technology, friendship, astrology, psychedelics, work, fame, and fortune. The novel won  the 2020 LAMBDA Literary Prize for Bisexual Fiction.

Duncan was a recipient of a 2021 Andy Warhol Foundation Arts Writers Grant and a 2022 Canadian Women Artists’ Awards. Both awards were used to co-curate artist Pippa Garner's first institutional exhibition in Europe at the Kunstverein München in Munich, Kunsthalle Zürich in Switzerland and the Frac Lorraine in Metz, France. Duncan announced that she has begun working closely with the artist to write her biography.

Awards and honours
 2022, Canadian Women Artists’ Award recipient in Literary Arts
 2020, Lambda Literary Award for Bisexual Fiction
 2019, Long-listed, The Golden Poppy Book Award

Publications 
 Exquisite Mariposa (Soft Skull Press, 2019). ISBN 9781593765781

See also 
 Social practice
 Pippa Garner
 Sarah Nicole Prickett
 Durga Chew-Bose

References 

21st-century Canadian novelists
21st-century Canadian women writers
21st-century American women writers
Bisexual writers
21st-century American women artists
21st-century American artists
21st-century American novelists
Lambda Literary Award winners
Writers from London, Ontario
Canadian curators
American curators
American women curators
Canadian women curators
Year of birth missing (living people)
Living people